Dick Bremer (born March 1, 1956) is a sports broadcaster for Bally Sports North. He has been the lead television announcer for the Minnesota Twins since 1983. He has also called Minnesota Golden Gophers men's basketball and Minnesota Golden Gophers football and hockey. He previously called Iowa Hawkeyes men's basketball and Minnesota North Stars games during his tenure.  He partners up with Justin Morneau, LaTroy Hawkins,  Roy Smalley or Glen Perkins for the Minnesota Twins television broadcasts. His longtime broadcast partner was Bert Blyleven.

Biography
Bremer was born in St. Paul, Minnesota. Raised in the small town of Dumont, Minnesota in Traverse County, Bremer was a graduate of Staples High School in Staples, Minnesota. He graduated from St. Cloud State University in St. Cloud, Minnesota in 1978.

Before his broadcasting career, Bremer was a Disc Jockey for KCLD (St. Cloud). His nickname was "Duke in the Dark". In 1983 he began broadcasting games for the Twins for Spectrum Sports. This was the second year of the Metrodome's existence. Bremer calls games on Fox Saturday Baseball currently with Mitch Williams in some games involving the Twins.

Bremer also took part in a Charter Communications commercial promoting watching football in High Definition.

Bremer and his wife Heidi live in St. Michael, Minnesota. They have a son and daughter, Erik and Hannah. Erik is, like his father, also a sportscaster. Bremer's father was a Lutheran Church–Missouri Synod pastor and Bremer has done public speaking at churches across the Midwest talking about his faith. He is a devout Lutheran.

On September 29, 2013, Bremer was inducted into the Minnesota Broadcasting Hall of Fame recognizing, among other things, his 30 seasons as the "Television Voice of the Minnesota Twins".

References

External links
 TwinCities.com: Minnesota Twins broadcaster Dick Bremer finds losses hard to take
 Minnesota Twins: Broadcasters 

1956 births
Living people
Major League Baseball broadcasters
Minnesota North Stars announcers
People from Staples, Minnesota
American sports announcers
Minnesota Twins announcers
Minnesota Vikings announcers
St. Cloud State University alumni
American Lutherans
National Hockey League broadcasters
College basketball announcers in the United States
College football announcers
College hockey announcers in the United States
People from Saint Paul, Minnesota
National Football League announcers
High school football announcers in the United States
High school basketball announcers in the United States